Scoles and Schoales are surnames, pronounced similarly. Notable people with these surnames include:

Scoles
Alexander Scoles (1844–1920), architect and Roman Catholic priest
Giacinto Scoles (born 1935), European and North American chemist and physicist
Ignatius Scoles SJ (1834–1896), Roman Catholic Jesuit priest, architect and writer
Joseph John Scoles (1798–1863), English Gothic Revival architect who designed many Roman Catholic churches
Mary Anne Scoles (1896–2007), Canadian supercentenarian born in Manitoba

Schoales
John Schoales, jun (1810–1847), official guardian of Parkhurst apprentices in Western Australia
John Whitelaw Schoales (1820–1903), Anglican priest in South Australia

See also
Scoles Manor, former farmhouse and a Grade II* listed building near Corfe Castle in Dorset, England
Coles (disambiguation)
Scholes (disambiguation)
Schoolies (disambiguation)
Scole
Scolesa